The 1998 Men's Asian Games Rugby sevens Tournament was held in Royal Thai Army Stadium from December 7, 1998 to December 8, 1998.

Results

Preliminary round

Group A

Group B

5th place match

Final round

Semifinals

Bronze medal match

Final

Final standing

References
Results

External links
Schedule

Men S